Alpine skiing has been contested at every Winter Olympics since 1936, when a combined event was held in Garmisch-Partenkirchen, Germany.

From 1948 to 1980, the Winter Olympics also served as the World Championships in Olympic years, with separate competitions held in even-numbered non-Olympic years. During this period, the Olympic medalists received an additional medal of the same metal from the International Ski Federation (FIS).

The giant slalom was introduced at the 1950 World Championships and at the Olympics in 1952; both programs dropped the combined event, but it returned in 1954 at the World Championships as a "paper" race, using the results of the slalom, giant slalom, and downhill. At the Olympics from 1956 through 1980, World Championship medals were awarded by the FIS in the combined event. It returned as a stand-alone event (one run of downhill, two runs of slalom) at the Olympics in 1988, which also debuted the one-run super-G. The combined event was run on an FIS points system at the Olympics through 1992, then was changed to total time of the three runs. The super combined debuted in 2010, which reduced the slalom portion to one run and the event to one day.

Since 1985, the World Championships have been scheduled every odd-numbered year, independent of the Winter Olympics. At the World Championships, the combined returned as a stand-alone event in 1982 and the super-G debuted in 1987. The combined event went from points to a total time in 1996 (postponed from 1995), and changed to super combined in 2007.

Hosts

Events

Men's

Women's

Mixed

Medal table 

NOCs in italics no longer compete at the Winter Olympics.
Sources (after the 2022 Winter Olympics):
Accurate as of 2022 Winter Olympics.

 Germany has competed at the Winter Olympic Games under various names; all of which are listed separately. Banned from the 1948 games (as was Japan), they competed as Germany in 1952, though only represented by West Germany. From 1956 through 1964, they were known as the United Team of Germany (EUA), which included East Germany, the German Democratic Republic (GDR). From 1968 through 1988, separate Olympic teams were fielded and West Germany competed as the Federal Republic of Germany (FRG). East Germany had only one competitor in alpine skiing (Eberhard Riedel in 1968), who did not win a medal. Following the reunification of 1990, they have competed at the Olympics as Germany, starting in 1992. Through 2018, Germany has a total of 40 medals in alpine skiing (17 gold, 13 silver, 10 bronze).

Notes
2 bronze medals awarded at 1948 men's downhill event
2 silver medals and no bronze were awarded at 1964 women's giant slalom event
2 silver medals and no bronze were awarded at 1992 women's giant slalom event
2 silver medals and no bronze were awarded at 1998 men's super-G event
2 gold medals and no silver were awarded at 2014 women's downhill event
2 bronze medals awarded at 2014 men's super-G event

Participating nations

Medals per year
Key

 bolded numbers indicate the highest medal count at that year's Olympic Games.

Age records
Several age-related records were recently set in 2014:
Bode Miller (36) oldest medalist in Olympic alpine skiing; bronze in super-G.
Mikaela Shiffrin (18) youngest gold medalist in slalom in Olympic alpine skiing; gold in slalom. 
 Mario Matt (34) oldest gold medalist in Olympic alpine skiing; gold in slalom.
Henrik Kristoffersen (19) youngest male medalist in Olympic alpine skiing; bronze in slalom.

These records continue:
 Michela Figini (17) youngest gold medalist in Olympic alpine skiing; gold in downhill in 1984. 
 Traudl Hecher (16) youngest medalist in Olympic alpine skiing; bronze in downhill in 1960.
 Toni Sailer (20) youngest male gold medalist in Olympic alpine skiing; won slalom, giant slalom, and downhill in 1956.

See also 
 Alpine skiing at the Winter Paralympics
 Alpine skiing at the Youth Olympic Games
 Alpine skiing World Cup
 FIS Alpine World Ski Championships
 World Para Alpine Skiing Championships
 List of Olympic venues in alpine skiing

References

External links 

 FIS-Ski.com – Alpine skiing results – Winter Olympics
Sports Reference – Winter Olympics – Alpine skiing
 Ski-db.com – results – Winter Olympics
 Olympic medalists – men
 Olympic medalists – women

 
Sports at the Winter Olympics
Olympics
Skiing at the Winter Olympics